A week is a time unit equal to seven days.

The word week may also refer to time cycles in other calendars, such as:
the eight-day week
the nine-day week
the Chinese ten-day week
for the 19-day Bahá'í "week" see Bahá'í calendar

Week as a proper noun  may also refer to:
 "Week" (Do As Infinity song), a 2001 song by Do As Infinity
 Week, Devon, a village in England
 The Week, a British news magazine, with US and Australian editions, founded in 1995.
 The Week (1933), a radical and antifascist weekly published by Marxist Claud Cockburn until 1941.
The Week (1964) a socialist newsweekly edited by Pat Jordan and published from 1964 until 1968.
 The Week (Canadian magazine), a literary and political magazine
 The Week (Indian magazine), a news magazine
 The Week (Brisbane), a former Australian newspaper (1876–1934)

WEEK may refer to:
 WEEK-TV, a television station licensed to Peoria, Illinois, United States
 WEEK-DT2, a digital subchannel service of WEEK-TV
 WEEK-DT3, a digital subchannel service of WEEK-TV
 WOAM, an AM radio station licensed to Peoria, Illinois, United States, which held the call sign WEEK until 1960
 WPIA, an FM radio station licensed to Eureka, Illinois, United States, which held the call sign WEEK-FM from 1997 to 1999

See also 
 Weeks (disambiguation)